Phrynobatrachus alleni is a species of frog in the family Phrynobatrachidae.
It is found in Ivory Coast, Ghana, Guinea, Liberia, Nigeria, and Sierra Leone.
Its natural habitats are subtropical or tropical moist lowland forest and intermittent freshwater marshes.
It is threatened by habitat loss.

References

alleni
Amphibians described in 1936
Taxonomy articles created by Polbot